This is a list of fictional characters that either self-identify as gay or have been identified by outside parties to be gay, becoming part of gay media. Listed characters are either recurring characters, cameos, guest stars, or one-off characters. For the purpose of this article, anime are considered any animations created in Japan and does not include any anime-influenced animation in the United States, Europe, parts of Asia, and elsewhere in the world. Also see the corresponding lists of lesbian and bisexual anime characters.

See the lists of lesbian, trans, bisexual, non-binary, pansexual, asexual, and intersex characters for information about fictional characters in other parts of the LGBTQ community.

The names are organized alphabetically by surname (i.e. last name), or by single name if the character does not have a surname. If more than two characters are in one entry, the last name of the first character is used.

From the 1980s to the 1990s

In the 2000s

In the 2010s

In the 2020s

Notes

See also

 Gay village
 Gay bashing
 List of lesbian, gay, bisexual or transgender-related films
 LGBT themes in comics
 List of animated series with LGBTQ characters
 List of polyamorous characters in fiction
 List of LGBT-themed speculative fiction
 List of LGBT characters in soap operas
 List of LGBT-related films
 Lists of LGBT figures in fiction and myth

References

Citations

Sources
 

gay
gay